Sukhmalpur Nizamabad is a census town in Firozabad district in the Indian state of Uttar Pradesh.

Demographics
 India census, Sukhmalpur Nizamabad had a population of 35,327. Males constitute 54% of the population and females 46%. Sukhmalpur Nizamabad has an average literacy rate of 57%, lower than the national average of 59.5%: male literacy is 65%, and female literacy is 46%. In Sukhmalpur Nizamabad, 20% of the population is under 6 years of age.

References

Cities and towns in Firozabad district